Phyllonorycter crimea is a moth of the family Gracillariidae. It is known from the Crimea in Ukraine.

References

crimea
Moths described in 2005
Moths of Europe